El Cacao  is a corregimiento in Mariato District, Veraguas Province, Panama with a population of 529 as of 2010. It was created by Law 27 of June 25, 2001.

References

Corregimientos of Veraguas Province